The Peugeot 302 is a mid-weight saloon introduced at the 1936 Paris Motor Show by Peugeot and listed, for just 18 months, until April 1938.

Background
The 302 was effectively a shortened version of the Peugeot 402 with a smaller engine. It was launched a year after the 402.

Positioning the 302
The aerodynamic 402 was enthusiastically received by the market, but it was half a class larger than the Citroën Traction Avant which had in many ways rewritten the rule book when launched in 1934, and which during the later 1930s acquired a range of different engine sizes and wheelbase lengths. The 302 could compete more directly with the Citroën as a modest return to stability after  the economic crisis of 1929 hinted at future growth in market demand for mid-sized saloons.  Nevertheless, by the time the car was actually launched the country was in a state of industrial turmoil and heightened political uncertainty.

A short life
Peugeot had ended production of their popular 201 model in September 1937, and its replacement, the smaller Peugeot 202 would appear only in February 1938.   At the time of Motor Show in October 1937 the Peugeot 302 was still listed, partly in order to help clear remaining stocks after what had been a precarious year for French industry, both economically and politically, but the car itself was absent from the Peugeot show-stand.  Through the autumn and winter of 1937/38 the 302 was the smallest and least expensive car on offer at Peugeot dealers.

The body

The 302 faithfully followed the style of the longer 402, complete with a sloping front grill behind which lurked the head lights. An eye catching detail was the hole for the starter handle on lower part of the front grill, which passed through the middle digit of the vertically inscribed name "302", coloured in patriotic blue, white and red.

In addition to the saloon and the manufacturer's own two-door four-seater cabriolet,  a small number of special bodied versions were produced including a Darl'mat built 302 roadster and a cabriolet incorporating the automatic fold-away steel roof design patented by Georges Paulin back in 1931.

Engine and running gear
The four cylinder water cooled 1758 cc engine was in most respects similar to the slightly larger engine fitted to the 402. Tax horsepower was 10 CV, rather than the 11 CV of the 402.

Power was delivered from the front-mounted engine to the rear wheels via a traditional three-speed gear box.

A couple of years earlier, Peugeot had scored a first among the volume automakers when they introduced an upgraded 201 featuring independent front suspension, and with competitors such as Renault reluctant to invest in keeping up on the technical front, and subsequent Peugeot models such as the 302 featuring independent front suspension, Peugeot were able to win plaudits for a technical advance which provided for superior road holding and comfort, especially when the car was driven briskly on poor roads. At the back the 302 used a rigid axle suspended using cantilever-spring combinations.

Sources and further reading

302
Rear-wheel-drive vehicles
1930s cars
Cars introduced in 1936